Kandis Williams is an artist, writer, editor, and publisher. Williams has received critical acclaim for her collage art, performance art, and publishing work. Williams lives and works in Los Angeles and Berlin. Williams is known for her art exploring racial issues, nationalism, and many other categories.

Early life 
Williams graduated from Cooper Union School of Art.

Artistic practice
Kandis Williams' work often explores contemporary critical theory including, but not limited to, racial-nationalism, authority, and eroticism. In addition to Williams' studio, writing, and publishing practices, Williams is also a visiting faculty member at Cal Arts School of Art.

Solo exhibitions 
A Line - 52 Walker, New York, NY - (2021)
A Field - Virginia Commonwealth University Institute for Contemporary Art]], Richmond, Virginia - (2020 - 2021) 
Her first solo show that runs from November 6, 2020 - August 1, 2021 is called “A Field”.

A Field is a live green house surrounded with multiple plants and plant sculptures as well as along the walls of the room. Williams also used wired plants instead of leaves to attach photos from history and use as a backdrop. With that Williams attaches multiple different photos including Mississippi chain gangs, images from Vintage Magazine, and depictions from tango dancers.  In addition to A Field there is a live video with a dancer that was also choreographed by Williams on the former Lorton Reformatory and Virginia State Prison Farm, where prisoners worked as time for their sentence.
Eurydice - 219 Madison - Brooklyn, New York - (2018)
WOP Works on Paper - Vienna - (2017)
Soft Colony - Night Gallery - Los Angeles - (2016)
Disfiguring Traditions - SADE - Los Angeles, CA - (2016)
Inner States - St. Charles Projects - Baltimore, Maryland - (2016)

Events, performances, workshops 
Fragile, Berlin 2019 
A Woman's Work, a PopRally event at MoMA organized by Rachel Kaadzi Ghansah - (2018)
Human Resources Los Angeles - (2016)

Group exhibitions 
The Studio Museum in Harlem, New York
The Underground Museum, Los Angeles
Neu West, Berlin
68 Projects, Berlin
The Breeder, Athens

Cassandra Press
Williams co-founded the non-profit Cassandra Press in 2016 with Taylor Doran, and Jordan Nassar. The organization distributes lo-fi activist and academic texts, flyers, posters, pamphlets, and readers as well as offer classes and exhibitions.

The name is a reference to the Trojan princess Cassandra, who was said to have accurately foretold the future yet no one would believe her.

Select awards and recognition 

 2021 Mohn Award (Hammer Museum) — $100,000

References

External links
Kandis Williams - Contemporary Art Daily
KANDIS WILLIAMS: YOUNG ARTISTS 2018 - cultured mag
Like No One's Looking - canadianart

Living people
African-American artists
Year of birth missing (living people)
21st-century African-American people